Oh Yeon-ji is a South Korean amateur boxer. She competed at the 2020 Summer Olympics in Tokyo, Japan.

References

1990 births
Living people
South Korean women boxers
Asian Games gold medalists for South Korea
Boxers at the 2018 Asian Games
Asian Games medalists in boxing
Medalists at the 2018 Asian Games
AIBA Women's World Boxing Championships medalists
People from Gunsan
Boxers at the 2020 Summer Olympics
Olympic boxers of South Korea
Sportspeople from North Jeolla Province
21st-century South Korean women